Jogiya may refer to:

Jogiya (album), an album by Gurdas Maan
Jogiya (raga), a raga in Hindustani classical music